The 8th World Table Tennis Championships were held in Paris from December 2 to 10, 1933. The Championships were held in December 1933 but are officially listed as the 1934 Championships.

Medalists

Team

Individual

References

External links
ITTF Museum

World Table Tennis Championships
World Table Tennis Championships
World Table Tennis Championships
Table tennis competitions in France
International sports competitions hosted by Paris
1933 in Paris
December 1933 sports events